Alfred Collins (1915 – 11 May 2007) was London's longest-serving taxi driver in 2007. He retired, and died on 11 May 2007.

Following 70 years of service, in 2007 Collins, aged 92, was honoured and presented an award by Transport for London at the Public Carriage Office. Collins drove his first passenger in 1937 and his passengers have included Margaret Thatcher, Joan Collins and Bruce Forsyth.

In an interview, Collins said:  "Life is all about communication and I have enjoyed sharing my vast experience of life as well as learning a lot with some of my passengers... It really does not seem that nearly 70 years has passed by. I have had the pleasure of meeting people from all walks of life, politicians, celebrities and the great British public".

References

1915 births
2007 deaths
British taxi drivers
People from Chipping Barnet
Taxis of London